Nathan Freudenthal Leopold Jr. (November 19, 1904 – August 29, 1971) and Richard Albert Loeb (June 11, 1905 – January 28, 1936), usually referred to collectively as Leopold and Loeb, were two wealthy students at the University of Chicago who kidnapped and murdered 14-year-old Bobby Franks in Chicago, Illinois, United States, in May 1924. They committed the murder – characterized at the time as "the crime of the century" – hoping to demonstrate superior intellect, which they believed enabled and entitled them to carry out a "perfect crime" without consequences.

After the two men were arrested, Loeb's family retained Clarence Darrow as lead counsel for their defense. Darrow's twelve-hour summation at their sentencing hearing is noted for its influential criticism of capital punishment as retributive rather than transformative justice. Both young men were sentenced to life imprisonment plus 99 years. Loeb was murdered by a fellow prisoner in 1936. Leopold was released on parole in 1958. The case has since served as the inspiration for several dramatic works.

Early lives

Nathan Leopold 
Nathan Leopold was born on November 19, 1904, in Chicago, Illinois, the son of Florence (née Foreman) and Nathan Leopold, a wealthy German-Jewish immigrant family. A child prodigy, Leopold claimed to have spoken his first words at the age of four months. At the time of the murder, he had completed an undergraduate degree at the University of Chicago with Phi Beta Kappa honors and planned to begin studies at Harvard Law School after a trip to Europe.

Unlike the handsome, athletic Loeb, Leopold was undersized, with rather bulging eyes. By many accounts, he was sensitive about his appearance. He threw himself into intellectual pursuits where he was met with remarkable success. Leopold had reportedly studied fifteen languages and claimed to speak five fluently. He had achieved a measure of national recognition as an ornithologist. Leopold and several other ornithologists identified the Kirtland's warbler and made astute observations about the parasitic nesting behavior of brown-headed cowbirds, which threatened the warblers. He maintained his interest in birds after his crime, writing to the Field Museum from his prison cell regarding specimens he had donated.

Richard Loeb 
Richard Loeb was born on June 11, 1905, in Chicago, the second of four sons of Anna Henrietta (née Bohnen) and Albert Henry Loeb, a wealthy lawyer and retired vice president of Sears, Roebuck & Company. His father was Jewish and his mother was Catholic. Like Leopold, Loeb was exceptionally intelligent. He was an avid reader, with a passion for historical novels and crimes stories. At age 12, he entered the innovative University High School. With the encouragement of his governess, he completed his high school education in two years. He would later go on to become the University of Michigan's youngest graduate at age 17. Following graduation from Michigan, Loeb enrolled in a course in constitutional history at the University of Chicago Law School.  At the time of the murder, he was especially interested in doing graduate work in history.

Compared with Leopold, Loeb was not as strictly intellectual. He often socialized, played tennis, and read detective novels.

Adolescence and early crimes 
The two young men grew up with their families in the affluent Kenwood neighborhood on Chicago's South Side. The Loebs owned a summer estate (now called Castle Farms) in Charlevoix, Michigan, as well as a mansion in Kenwood, two blocks from the Leopold home.

Though Leopold and Loeb knew each other casually while growing up, they began to see more of each other in mid-1920, and their relationship flourished at the University of Chicago, particularly after they discovered a mutual interest in crime. Leopold was particularly fascinated by Friedrich Nietzsche's concept of "supermen" (Übermenschen), interpreting them as transcendent individuals possessing extraordinary and unusual capabilities, whose superior intellects allowed them to rise above the laws and rules that bound the unimportant, average populace.

Leopold believed that he and Loeb were such individuals, and as such, by his interpretation of Nietzsche's doctrines, they were not bound by any of society's normal ethics or rules. In a letter to Loeb, he wrote, "A superman ... is, on account of certain superior qualities inherent in him, exempted from the ordinary laws which govern men. He is not liable for anything he may do." 

The pair began asserting their perceived immunity from normal restrictions with acts of petty theft and vandalism. Breaking into a fraternity house at the University of Michigan, they stole penknives, a camera, and a typewriter that they later used to type their ransom note. Emboldened, they progressed to a series of more serious crimes, including arson, but no one seemed to notice. Disappointed with the absence of media coverage of their crimes, they decided to plan and execute a sensational "perfect crime" that would garner public attention and confirm their self-perceived status as "supermen".

Murder of Bobby Franks 

Leopold and Loeb, who were 19 and 18, respectively, at the time, settled on kidnapping and murdering a younger adolescent as their perfect crime. They spent seven months planning everything, from the method of abduction to disposal of the body. To obfuscate the actual nature of their crime and motive, they decided to make a ransom demand, and devised an intricate plan for collecting it involving a long series of complex instructions to be communicated, one set at a time, by phone. They typed the final set of instructions involving the actual money drop in the form of a ransom note, using the typewriter stolen from the fraternity house. A chisel was selected as the murder weapon and purchased.

After a lengthy search for a suitable victim, mostly on the grounds of the Harvard School for Boys in the Kenwood area, where Leopold had been educated, the pair decided upon Robert "Bobby" Franks, the 14-year-old son of wealthy Chicago watch manufacturer Jacob Franks. Bobby Franks was Loeb's second cousin and an across-the-street neighbor who had played tennis at the Loeb residence several times.

Leopold and Loeb put their plan in motion on the afternoon of May 21, 1924. Using an automobile that Leopold rented under the name Morton D. Ballard, they offered Franks a ride as he walked home from school. The boy initially refused, because his destination was less than two blocks away, but Loeb persuaded him to enter the car to discuss a tennis racket that he had been using. The precise sequence of the events that followed remains in dispute, but a preponderance of opinion placed Leopold behind the wheel of the car while Loeb sat in the back seat with the chisel. Loeb struck Franks, who was sitting in front of him in the passenger seat, several times in the head with the chisel, then dragged him into the back seat and gagged him, where he died.

After nightfall, they removed and discarded Franks' clothes, then concealed the body in a culvert along the Pennsylvania Railroad tracks north of the lake. To obscure the body's identity, they poured hydrochloric acid on the face and genitals to disguise the fact that he had been circumcised.

By the time the two men returned to Chicago, word had already spread that Franks was missing. Leopold called Franks's mother, identifying himself as "George Johnson", and told her that Franks had been kidnapped; instructions for delivering the ransom would follow. After mailing the typed ransom note and burning their blood-stained clothing, then cleaning the blood stains from the rented vehicle's upholstery, they spent the remainder of the evening playing cards.

Once the Franks family received the ransom note on the following morning, Leopold called a second time and dictated the first set of instructions for the ransom payment. The intricate plan stalled almost immediately when a nervous family member forgot the address of the store where he was supposed to receive the next set of directions, and it was abandoned entirely when word came that Franks's body had been found. Leopold and Loeb destroyed the typewriter and burned a car robe (lap blanket) they had used to move the body. They then went about their lives as usual.

Chicago police launched an intensive investigation; rewards were offered for information. While Loeb went about his daily routine quietly, Leopold spoke freely to police and reporters, offering theories to anyone who would listen. He even told one detective, "If I were to murder anybody, it would be just such a cocky little son of a bitch as Bobby Franks."

Police found a pair of eyeglasses near Franks's body. Although common in prescription and frame, they were fitted with an unusual hinge purchased by only three customers in Chicago, one of whom was Leopold. When questioned, Leopold offered the possibility that his glasses might have dropped out of his pocket during a bird-watching trip the previous weekend. 

Leopold and Loeb were summoned for formal questioning on May 29. They asserted that on the night of the murder, they had picked up two women in Chicago using Leopold's car, then dropped them off some time later near a golf course without learning their last names. Their alibi was exposed as a fabrication when Leopold's chauffeur told police that he was repairing Leopold's car while the men claimed to be using it. The chauffeur's wife confirmed that the car was parked in the Leopold garage on the night of the murder. The destroyed typewriter was recovered from the Jackson Park Lagoon on June 7.

Confession 
Loeb was the first to confess. He asserted that Leopold had planned everything and had killed Franks in the back seat of the car while Loeb drove. Leopold's confession followed swiftly thereafter. He insisted that he was the driver and Loeb the murderer. Their confessions otherwise corroborated most of the evidence in the case. Both confessions were announced by the state's attorney on May 31. 

Leopold later claimed, long after Loeb was dead, that he pleaded in vain with Loeb to admit to killing Franks. "Mompsie feels less terrible than she might, thinking you did it", he quotes Loeb as saying, "and I'm not going to take that shred of comfort away from her." Most observers believed that Loeb did strike the fatal blows. Some circumstantial evidence – including testimony from eyewitness Carl Ulvigh, who said he saw Loeb driving and Leopold in the back seat minutes before the kidnapping – suggested that Leopold could have been the killer.

Both Leopold and Loeb admitted that they were driven by their thrill-seeking, Übermenschen (supermen) delusions, and their aspiration to commit a "perfect crime". Neither claimed to have looked forward to the killing, but Leopold admitted interest in learning what it would feel like to be a murderer. He was disappointed to note that he felt the same as ever.

Trial 

The trial of Leopold and Loeb at Chicago's Cook County Criminal Court became a media spectacle and the third – after those of Harry Thaw and Sacco and Vanzetti – to be labeled "the trial of the century." Loeb's family hired the renowned criminal defense attorney Clarence Darrow to lead the defense team. It was rumored that Darrow was paid $1 million for his services, but he was actually paid $70,000. Darrow took the case because he was a staunch opponent of capital punishment.

While it was generally assumed that the men's defense would be based on a plea of not guilty by reason of insanity, Darrow concluded that a jury trial would almost certainly end in conviction and the death penalty. Thus, he elected to enter a plea of guilty, hoping to convince Cook County Circuit Court Judge John R. Caverly to impose sentences of life imprisonment.

The trial, technically an extended sentencing, as their guilty pleas had already been accepted, ran for thirty-two days. The state's attorney, Robert E. Crowe, presented over 100 witnesses, documenting details of the crime. The defense presented extensive psychiatric testimony in an effort to establish mitigating circumstances, including childhood neglect in the form of absent parenting, and in Leopold's case, sexual abuse by a governess. 

One piece of evidence was a letter written by Leopold claiming that he and Loeb were having a homosexual affair. Both the prosecution and the defense interpreted this information as supportive of their own position. Darrow called a series of expert witnesses, who offered a catalog of Leopold's and Loeb's abnormalities. One witness testified to their dysfunctional endocrine glands, another to the delusions that had led to their crime.

Darrow's speech 
Darrow's impassioned, twelve-hour-long "masterful plea" at the conclusion of the hearing has been called the finest speech of his career. Its principal arguments were that the methods and punishments of the American justice system were inhumane, and the youth and immaturity of the accused:

The judge was persuaded, but he explained in his ruling that his decision was based primarily on precedent and the youth of the accused. On September 10, 1924, he sentenced both Leopold and Loeb to life imprisonment for the murder, and an additional 99 years for the kidnapping. A little over a month later, Loeb's father died of heart failure.

Prison 

Leopold and Loeb initially were held at Joliet Prison. Although they were kept apart as much as possible, the two managed to maintain their friendship. Leopold was transferred to Stateville Penitentiary in 1931, and Loeb was later transferred there as well. Once reunited, the two expanded the prison school system, adding a high school and junior college curriculum.

Loeb's death 
On January 28, 1936, Loeb was attacked by fellow inmate James Day with a straight razor in a shower room; he died soon after in the prison hospital. Day claimed that Loeb had sexually assaulted him, but he was unharmed while Loeb sustained more than fifty wounds, including defensive wounds on his arms and hands. His throat had been slashed from behind. News accounts suggested Loeb had propositioned Day; the authorities, perhaps embarrassed by alleged same-sex behavior in the prison, ruled that Day was defending himself.

A sexual motive for the killing was suggested. While some sources state that newsman Ed Lahey began his story in the Chicago Daily News with the lead, "Richard Loeb, despite his erudition, today ended his sentence with a proposition" – no evidence has been found that this lead was ever published, and actual copy from that date reads otherwise. 

On February 19, 1936, in a column printed in the Syracuse Journal, Mark Hellinger wrote, "I must tell you of the line that came to me from an unknown correspondent in Chicago. This anonymous contributor said he had the absolute low-down on the recent slaying of Dickie Loeb. Seems that Loeb made a slight mistake in grammar. He ended a sentence in a proposition..." Other newspapers at the time appeared to praise Day, who was later tried and acquitted of Loeb's murder.

There is no evidence that Loeb was a sexual predator while in prison, but Day was later caught at least once in a sexual act with a fellow inmate. In his autobiography, Life Plus 99 Years, Leopold ridiculed Day's claim that Loeb had attempted to sexually assault him. This was echoed by the prison's Catholic chaplain, a confidant of Loeb's, who said that it was more likely that Day attacked Loeb after Loeb rebuffed his advances.

Leopold's prison life 

Leopold continued with his work after Loeb's death. Despite suffering from depression, he became a model prisoner and made many significant contributions to improving conditions at Stateville Penitentiary. These included reorganizing the prison library, revamping the schooling system and teaching its students, and volunteer work in the prison hospital. In 1944, Leopold volunteered for the Stateville Penitentiary Malaria Study. He was deliberately inoculated with malaria pathogens and then subjected to several experimental malaria treatments. He later wrote that all his good work in prison and after his release was an effort to compensate for his crime.  

In the early 1950s, author Meyer Levin, a classmate at the University of Chicago, requested Leopold's cooperation in writing a novel based on the Franks murder. Leopold responded that he did not wish his story told in fictionalized form, but offered Levin a chance to contribute to his own memoir, which was in progress. Levin, unhappy with that suggestion, went ahead with his book alone, despite Leopold's express objections. The novel, titled Compulsion, was published in 1956. 

Levin portrayed Leopold, under the pseudonym Judd Steiner, as a brilliant but deeply disturbed teenager, psychologically driven to kill because of his troubled childhood and an obsession with Loeb. Leopold later wrote that reading Levin's book made him "physically sick... More than once I had to lay the book down and wait for the nausea to subside. I felt as I suppose a man would feel if he were exposed stark-naked under a strong spotlight before a large audience."

Leopold's autobiography, Life Plus 99 Years, was published in 1958 as part of his campaign to win parole. In beginning his account with the immediate aftermath of the crime, he engendered widespread criticism for his deliberate refusal, expressly stated in the book, to recount his childhood or to describe any details of the murder. He was accused of writing the book solely as a means of rehabilitating his public image by ignoring the dark side of his past.

Leopold's post-prison years 

After thirty-three years and numerous unsuccessful petitions, Leopold was paroled in March 1958. The Brethren Service Commission, a Church of the Brethren-affiliated program, accepted him as a medical technician at its hospital in Puerto Rico. He expressed his appreciation in an article: "To me the Brethren Service Commission offered the job, the home, and the sponsorship without which a man cannot be paroled. But it gave me so much more than thatthe companionship, the acceptance, the love which would have rendered a violation of parole almost impossible." He was known as "Nate" to neighbors and to co-workers at Castañer General Hospital in Adjuntas, where he worked as a laboratory and X-ray assistant.

Later in 1958, Leopold attempted to set up the Leopold Foundation, to be funded by royalties from Life Plus 99 Years, "to aid emotionally disturbed, retarded, or delinquent youths." The State of Illinois voided his charter on grounds that it violated the terms of his parole.

In 1959, Leopold sought to block production of the film version of Compulsion on the grounds that Levin's book had invaded his privacy, defamed him, profited from his life story, and "intermingled fact and fiction to such an extent that they were indistinguishable." Eventually the Illinois Supreme Court ruled against him, holding that Leopold, as the confessed perpetrator of the "crime of the century", could not reasonably argue that any book had injured his reputation.

Leopold moved to Santurce and married a widowed florist. He earned a master's degree at the University of Puerto Rico, then taught classes there. He became a researcher in the social service program of Puerto Rico's department of health. He worked for an urban renewal and housing agency. He did research on leprosy at the University of Puerto Rico School of Medicine. 

Leopold was active in the Natural History Society of Puerto Rico, traveling throughout the island to observe its birdlife. In 1963, he published Checklist of Birds of Puerto Rico and the Virgin Islands. While he spoke of his intention to write a book titled Reach for a Halo about his life following prison, he never did.

Leopold died of a diabetes-related heart attack on August 29, 1971, at the age of 66.

In popular culture 
The Franks murder has inspired works of film, theatre, and fiction, including the 1929 play Rope by Patrick Hamilton, performed on BBC television in 1939, and Alfred Hitchcock's film of the same name in 1948. A fictionalized version of the events formed the basis of Meyer Levin's 1956 novel Compulsion and its 1959 film adaptation. In 1957, two more fictionalized novels were released: Nothing but the Night by James Yaffe and Little Brother Fate by Mary-Carter Roberts. Never the Sinner, John Logan's 1985 play, was based on contemporary newspaper accounts of the case, and included an explicit portrayal of Leopold and Loeb's sexual relationship. In 2019, the story was fictionally retold again in the third season of The Sinner.

The case is referenced in the play Inherit the Wind, in which one major character is a fictionalized version of Darrow.

In his book Murder Most Queer (2014), theater scholar Jordan Schildcrout examines changing attitudes toward homosexuality in various theatrical and cinematic representations of the Leopold and Loeb case.

Other works said to be influenced by the case include Richard Wright's 1940 novel Native Son, the Columbo episode "Columbo Goes To College" (1990),  Tom Kalin's 1992 film Swoon, Michael Haneke's 1997 Austrian film Funny Games and the 2008 International remake, Barbet Schroeder's Murder by Numbers (2002), Daniel Clowes's 2005 graphic novel Ice Haven, Stephen Dolginoff's 2005 off-Broadway musical Thrill Me: The Leopold and Loeb Story,
and the film Scream (1996).

References

Citations

Bibliography 

 Leopold, Nathan F. Life plus 99 Years, 1958 (Introduction by Erle Stanley Gardner) 
 Baatz, Simon. For the Thrill of It: Leopold, Loeb and the Murder that Shocked Chicago (HarperCollins, 2008).
 Baatz, Simon. "Criminal Minds," Smithsonian Magazine 39 (August 2008): 70–79.
 Higdon, Hal. Leopold and Loeb: The Crime of the Century, University of Illinois Press, 1999. (originally published in 1975) 
 Kalin, Tom (director), Swoon. Film, 1990
 Levin, Meyer. Compulsion, Carroll & Graf Publishers, 1996. (originally published in 1956). 
 Logan, John (author), Never the Sinner (play), Samuel French, Inc., 1987
 Saul, John (author). In the Dark of the Night, 2006 
 Dolginoff, Stephen (author/composer). Thrill Me: The Leopold & Loeb Story (musical, published by Dramatists Play Service) 
 Morita, Yoshimitsu (director). Copycat Killer. Film, 2002
 Leopold, N.F. 1963. Checklist of the Birds of Puerto Rico and the Virgin Islands. University of Puerto Rico, Rio Piedras.

External links 

 Leopold and Loeb Trial Home Page by Douglas Linder. Famous American TrialsIllinois v. Nathan Leopold and Richard Loeb. University of Missouri at Kansas City Law School. 1997. Retrieved September 14, 2008.
 Nathan Leopold and Richard Loeb, Crime of the 20th Century by Marilyn Bardsley. Crime LibraryCourtroom Television Network. Retrieved April 11, 2007.
 Northwestern University Archives
 Thrill Me:The Leopold and Loeb Storymain site/CD ordering
 Thrill Me:The Leopold and Loeb Story Review quotes from York Theatre Company
 Harold S. Hulbert Papers from Northwestern University Archives, Evanston, Illinois
 "Leopold and Loeb Collection" from Northwestern University Special Collections, Evanston, Illinois

 The Loeb-Leopold case : with excerpts from the evidence of the alienists and including the arguments to the court by counsel for the people and the defense (1926) stored on Archive.org
 Murder by Birder – A Brain Scoop video episode featuring Nathan Leopold
The Case of The Perfect Murder Gone Wrong (Leopold and Loeb) (Real True Crime // LegalEagle) – by the YouTube channel LegalEagle

 
1900s births
20th-century American trials
20th-century American criminals
American murderers of children
American people convicted of murder
People convicted of murder by Illinois
American people convicted of kidnapping
1924 murders in the United States
Clarence Darrow
Crimes in Chicago
Crime in Chicago
Criminals from Chicago
Crime in Illinois
Criminals from Illinois
Criminal duos
American people of German-Jewish descent
American male criminals
Male murderers
Violence against men in North America
University of Chicago alumni
Incidents of violence against boys